When They See Us is a 2019 American crime drama television miniseries created, co-written, and directed by Ava DuVernay for Netflix, that premiered in four parts on May 31, 2019. It is based on events of the 1989 Central Park jogger case and explores the lives and families of the five Black and Latino male suspects who were falsely accused then prosecuted on charges related to the rape and assault of a white woman in Central Park, New York City. The series features an ensemble cast, including Jharrel Jerome, Asante Blackk, Jovan Adepo, Michael K. Williams, Logan Marshall-Green, Joshua Jackson, Blair Underwood, Vera Farmiga, John Leguizamo, Felicity Huffman, Niecy Nash, Aunjanue Ellis, Marsha Stephanie Blake, and Kylie Bunbury.

When They See Us received critical acclaim, with particular praise for its cast. At the 71st Primetime Emmy Awards, it received 11 nominations; Jerome won for Outstanding Lead Actor in a Limited Series or Movie while it was nominated for Outstanding Limited Series and Ellis, Nash, Blackk, Leguizamo, Williams, Blake, and Farmiga all received acting nominations. The series also won the Critics' Choice Television Award for Best Limited Series.

A companion special, titled Oprah Winfrey Presents When They See Us Now, in which the cast, the creator, and the exonerated five are interviewed, premiered on June 12, 2019, on Netflix and the Oprah Winfrey Network.

Premise
When They See Us is based on events of the April 19, 1989, Central Park jogger case and explores the lives of the five suspects who were prosecuted on charges related to the sexual assault of a female victim, and of their families. The five juvenile males of color, the protagonists of the series: Kevin Richardson (Asante Blackk), Antron McCray (Caleel Harris), Yusef Salaam (Ethan Herisse), Korey Wise (Jharrel Jerome), and Raymond Santana (Marquis Rodriguez), were divided by the prosecutor into two groups for trial. Each youth was convicted by juries of various charges related to the assault; four were convicted of rape. They were sentenced to maximum terms for juveniles except for  Korey Wise. He had been held in facilities and served his time in prison.

They filed a suit against the city in 2003 for wrongful conviction and were awarded a settlement in 2014.

Cast and characters

Main
 Asante Blackk as Kevin Richardson
 Justin Cunningham as adult Kevin Richardson
 Caleel Harris as Antron McCray
 Jovan Adepo as adult Antron McCray
 Ethan Herisse as Yusef Salaam
 Chris Chalk as adult Yusef Salaam
 Jharrel Jerome as Korey Wise
 Marquis Rodriguez as Raymond Santana
 Freddy Miyares as adult Raymond Santana
 Marsha Stephanie Blake as Linda McCray, Antron McCray's mother.
 Kylie Bunbury as Angie Richardson, an older sister of Kevin Richardson.
 Aunjanue Ellis as Sharonne Salaam, Yusef Salaam's mother.
 Vera Farmiga as Elizabeth Lederer
 Felicity Huffman as Linda Fairstein
 John Leguizamo as Raymond Santana Sr., Raymond Santana's father.
 Niecy Nash as Delores Wise, Korey Wise's mother.
 Michael K. Williams as Bobby McCray, Antron McCray's father.

Recurring
 Omar Dorsey as Elombe Brath, a community organizer and activist who appears in the media to defend the five
 Suzzanne Douglas as Grace Cuffe
 Christopher Jackson as Peter Rivera, lawyer who represented Raymond
 Joshua Jackson as Michael Joseph, lawyer who defended Antron
 Famke Janssen as Nancy Ryan, a Manhattan ADA originally assigned to the case before it was given to Lederer and later oversaw the overturning of the five's convictions
 Adepero Oduye as Nomsa Brath, a community organizer and activist who takes on her husband Elombe's cause after his death
 Aurora Perrineau as Tanya, girlfriend of Raymond Santana Jr. (adult)
 Storm Reid as Lisa, girlfriend of Korey Wise
 William Sadler as Michael Sheehan
 Blair Underwood as Bobby Burns, lawyer who represented Yusef
 Len Cariou as Robert Morgenthau
 Chukwudi Iwuji as Colin Moore, lawyer who represented Korey
 Frank Pando as Detective Gonzalez
 Alexandra Templer as Trisha Meili
 Jayce Bartok as Detective Hildebrandt
 Dascha Polanco as Elena, new wife of Raymond Santana Sr.

Guest
 Allan Greenberg as Howard Diller, lawyer who represented Kevin
 Isis King as Marci Wise, Korey's sister, who is a transgender woman
 Logan Marshall-Green as Roberts
 Gary Perez as Manuel Santana
 Reece Noi as Matias Reyes

Episodes

Special

Production

Development
On July 6, 2017, it was announced that Netflix had given the production Central Park Five a series order consisting of five episodes. The series was created by Ava DuVernay who was also set to write and direct. Executive producers were expected to include DuVernay, Jeff Skoll, Jonathan King, Oprah Winfrey, Jane Rosenthal and Berry Welsh. Production companies involved with the series were set to include Participant Media, Harpo Films, and Tribeca Productions. On July 9, 2018, it was reported that the series would consist of four episodes, Bradford Young would serve as the series' cinematographer, and Robin Swicord, Attica Locke, and Michael Starrbury would cowrite each episode with DuVernay.

On March 1, 2019, DuVernay announced the series had been retitled When They See Us and would be released on May 31, 2019. The announcement was accompanied by the release of a teaser.

Casting
In July 2018, it was announced that Michael K. Williams, Vera Farmiga, John Leguizamo, Felicity Huffman, Jharrel Jerome, and Jovan Adepo had joined the series' main cast. On August 3, 2018, it was reported that Niecy Nash, Aunjanue Ellis, Kylie Bunbury, Marsha Stephanie Blake, and Storm Reid had been cast in supporting roles. A week later, it was announced that Chris Chalk, Ethan Herisse, Marquis Rodriguez, Caleel Harris, Freddy Miyares, Justin Cunningham and Asante Blackk had filled out the main cast, both as adults and as teenagers. By the end of the month, it was reported that Joshua Jackson, Christopher Jackson, Adepero Oduye, Omar Dorsey, Blair Underwood, Famke Janssen, William Sadler, and Aurora Perrineau had also joined the cast.

Filming
Principal photography for the series began during the week of August 6, 2018, in New York City, with cinematography by Bradford Young. On August 10, 2018, filming took place on Madison Avenue in the East Harlem area of Manhattan.

Reception

Audience viewership
On June 25, 2019, Netflix announced that the miniseries had been streamed by over 23 million viewers within its first month of release.

Critical response
When They See Us received widespread critical acclaim. On review aggregator Rotten Tomatoes, the miniseries has an approval rating of 97% based on 86 reviews, with an average rating of 8.4/10. The website's critics consensus reads: "Ava DuVernay pulls no punches in When They See Us, laying out the harrowing events endured by the Central Park Five while adding a necessary layer of humanity to their story that challenges viewers to reconsider what it means to find justice in America." On Metacritic, it has a weighted average score of 86 out of 100, based on 27 critics, indicating "universal acclaim".

Daniel D'Addario from Variety mentioned in a glowing review of the miniseries, that "When They See Us immerses viewers in a tale with none of the gaudy fun that true crime often offers. It's an achievement and, given its pride of place on a streaming service despite its difficult subject matter, a worthy use of its director’s star power." Roger Eberts Odie Henderson awarded the series a rating of 3 and 1/2 out of four stars, noting that "there’s a lot to recommend When They See Us. It does as much as it can to recast the gaze on Black and brown people, eliciting empathy and the desire for justice. It demonizes the right people and demands your fury over the events presented." Daniel Fienberg from The Hollywood Reporter recommended the miniseries in his review by highlighting that "When They See Us is a rigorous attempt to chronicle an epic legal failure and to help restore a sense of the men as individuals, rather than faceless members of a wrongfully accused collective." Commending DuVernay's thematic and thoughtful approach to the subject matter and content, he adds that the series avoids the "typical triumph-over-adversity narrative tropes".

Matt Goldberg of Collider gave it a very positive review, writing: "The emotional impact of When They See Us cannot be understated." He said further, "I watched The Central Park Five earlier this month, and it's a good way to understand the case and its basic facts, but even though [it] has interviews with all five men, it doesn't come close to what DuVernay does here with this cast, her craftsmanship, and Bradford Young's stunning cinematography." Lucy Mangan from The Guardian complimented the miniseries, saying it is

In a positive review of the miniseries, Jen Chaney from Vulture wrote that, "When They See Us, Ava DuVernay's sensitively wrought Netflix miniseries about what happened to those boys, strips away the dehumanizing tendency to bunch them together and instead shows what each of them dealt with individually when they were coerced into giving false confessions, forced to do time for a crime they did not commit, and, eventually, exonerated when their convictions were vacated in 2002."

Willa Paskin of Slate gave the series a positive recommendation, writing that "When They See Us may be making an appeal to our duty to attend to this not-at-all-ancient history—but is not, itself, dutiful. In one aspect, in particular, DuVernay's approach is refreshingly unencumbered." Robert Lloyd from Los Angeles Times praised the series, stating that it is "a story about parents and children as much as it is about justice and race — the series has plenty of contemporary resonance on the latter account — and there is strong work from Niecy Nash, John Leguizamo, Aunjanue Ellis and Michael Kenneth Williams among the older generation."

Armond White from National Review criticized the series in his review, unfavorably contrasting its portrayal of racial tension and violence to period films like Boyz n the Hood and Do the Right Thing.

Accolades

Fairstein reaction and lawsuit
Linda Fairstein, the original New York prosecutor of the case, wrote of the Netflix series in an op-ed for the Wall Street Journal that it was "so full of distortions and falsehoods as to be an outright fabrication." The lawyer-turned-New York Times bestselling author said she agreed with exonerations of the rape charges against the five — but said "the other charges, for crimes against other victims, should not have been vacated."

John E. Reid & Associates took DuVernay, ARRA, and Netflix to court in October 2019 because the series called the company's once widely used trademark controversial interrogation technique as "universally rejected." A federal judge dismissed the lawsuit "Because the First Amendment protects non-factual assertions". In March 2020, Fairstein filed suit in the U.S. District Court for the Middle District of Florida against Netflix, DuVernay, and Locke for defamation based on her portrayal in the series. In August 2021, the District Court ruled that some of Farstein's claims of defamation and civil conspiracy may proceed to trial.

See also
 Racism in the United States

Notes

References

External links
 
 

2010s American crime drama television series
2010s American drama television miniseries
2010s American legal television series
2019 American television series debuts
2019 American television series endings
American biographical series
American thriller television series
BAFTA winners (television series)
English-language Netflix original programming
Television series based on actual events
Television series set in 1989
Television series set in the 1980s
Television series set in the 1990s
Television series set in the 2000s
Television shows set in New York City
Central Park